Amy van Buuren (born 20 May 1969) is a Dutch former professional tennis player.

Debuting on the professional tour in the late 1980s, van Buuren was most successful as a doubles player, with a best ranking of 114 in the world. In 1991, she featured in the main draw of three Grand Slam tournaments, reaching the second rounds of the French Open and Wimbledon, both partnering Gaby Coorengel.

ITF finals

Singles (0–2)

Doubles (4–12)

References

External links
 
 

1969 births
Living people
Dutch female tennis players